Jamalpur and Khadiya are two adjacent areas in Ahmedabad district in Gujarat. The two areas used to have a separate Vidhan Sabha seat for themselves. But this seat came into existence after 2008 delimitation after merging erstwhile Jamalpur and Khadiya seats. 

Jamalpur area is home to a very crowded marker.

See also
 Jamalpur-Khadiya (Vidhan Sabha constituency)

References

Ahmedabad district